Vučko (Serbo-Croatian Cyrillic: Вучко) is the Olympic mascot of the 1984 Winter Olympics in Sarajevo. It was created by the Slovenian painter Jože Trobec. The mascot is a wolf, an animal typically found in the forests of the Dinaric Alps region. Vučko was at the time the hero of a cartoon created by Nedeljko Dragić, published in several Yugoslavian newspapers. The wolf is a prominent figure in Yugoslavian fables: he embodies courage and strength and symbolises winter. Through his smiling, frightened or serious facial expressions, Vučko gave the wolf a rather friendly appearance and even helped to change the usually ferocious image of this animal.

The mascot was chosen through a contest entered by 836 participants. After an initial selection, six projects were chosen. The other proposals were a snowball, a mountain goat, a weasel, a lamb and a hedgehog. Readers of various newspapers and magazines could later vote for the final mascot.

Notes

External links

1984 Winter Olympics
Fictional wolves
Olympic mascots
Fictional Bosnian people
Fictional Yugoslav people